Sturemordet may refer to
the Sture Murders
Sturemordet by Stieg Trenter